CISV International (Formerly Children's International Summer Villages) was founded in 1950 by Dr. Doris Twitchell Allen and aims to educate and inspire action for a more just and peaceful world.

The organisation operates international educational programmes on an annual basis to bring together participants from member countries. CISV also operates in large cities and in smaller communities through its around 200 local Chapters in 69 countries.

CISV International is a UNESCO partner Non Governmental Organization (NGO), holds participatory status with the Council of Europe and is a candidate member of the European Youth Forum.

History
CISV was founded in 1950, after World War II, by Dr. Doris Twitchell Allen. Since then, the organisation has expanded into around 69 countries, and over 300,000 delegates have participated in more than seven thousand international CISV activities that delegates have made up over the course of these years.  

For Dr. Allen and the CISV organisation, children and youth were seen as the ideal starting point for peace education.  Programmes were developed which offered young people opportunities to meet their peers from other countries and to form intercultural friendships and to learn about what life is really like where they come from. Local programmes give people the chance to learn about the cultures in their own communities and explore important themes related to peace and understanding.

The first village was held in 1951 in Glendale, Ohio; commissioned for its 50th anniversary, the sculpture "How Alike I Am to You” was created in 2000 by Tim Werrell and stands on the property of the Harry Whiting Brown Community Center in Glendale, Ohio.

CISV programmes
The CISV International delivers its education through its seven official programmes:

 Village: Today, delegations composed of four children and one adult "Leader" from 12 countries come together for a four-week programme for 11-year-old children, who participate in activities based around simple activities that indirectly promote peace and understanding of each other.  Each delegation consists of two boys, two girls, and an adult leader. Additionally, there are five or six Junior Counsellors (JCs, age 16–17) invited, who help bridge the gap between the adults and youth. There is also a STAFF that takes cares of the camp and it is, usually, a group of 5-6 adults. The staff is responsible for organizing all the structure so the camp can happen.
 Step Up: A three-week programme for participants 14–15 years of age. Delegations include 4 participants and an adult leader. In Step Ups participants can think of new rules for the camp, these will be discussed and voted upon in a so-called 'camp meeting'. Also, the delegates are largely responsible for putting together activities to promote social and leadership skills. Each delegation consists of two boys, two girls, and an adult leader.
 Interchange: Involving only two countries, this programme spans up to two years. A delegation of 6–12 youth, aged 12–14, is selected from each participating country. In the programme one delegation will travel to visit for two or four weeks with the other's family.  After those weeks and a little time in between, the delegations reciprocate. Each delegation has one adult leader, and may also have a Junior Leader.
 Youth Meeting: An 8 or 15 day programme for either 12–13, 14–15, 16–18 or 19+. This programme is based on a specific theme. For youth 12–15 each delegation consists of six young people, and an adult leader. People at the age 16+ travel alone.
 Seminar Camp: A three-week programme for youth 17–18 in which there is one or more (but not more than four) delegates from each participating country.  Seminar Camps have a more direct educational approach, and youth are encouraged to form opinions on various world issues. Usually youth-directed, this program has only thirty participants in total.
 International People's Project:  CISV's newest international programme is open to people aged 19+ and is three weeks long. Participants participate in hands-on work contributing to a local community project.
 Mosaic: Mosaic is a programme that consists of projects with educational content, developed by local CISV Chapters worldwide.  These projects empower individuals to be agents of change, reach out, and involve as many people as possible.

The CISV International website provides more detailed information.

CISV Chapters also hold activities that aim to share the CISV experience within their local community.

In addition to this CISV International delivers its education through:

 Junior Branch (JB): Junior Branch is an integral, but self-governing youth-based part of the structure of CISV. Junior Branch develops intercultural skills and attitude through educational and administrative activities consistent with CISV Goals.
 Mini Camp: A weekend-long camp within the local chapter. It is planned and run by local Juniors and leaders, often the older members of the chapter. It is a chance for participants to have a camp like experience locally and allows potential delegates and JCs to have a taste what a few days at camp may be like. Often delegate, leader and JC selection takes place at Mini Camps and activities can range from sports, to simulation activities to guest speakers and much more. 
 CISV also has other things you can do, such as being a leader, more commonly meant for the Village, Step-Up, and Interchange (Also for NYM). They are the ones who take the delegations to the Camp/Village. There are also usually 6 Junior Counselors (JCs) on a Village picked from chapters around the world who provide a link between children and adults on Villages. They are age 16-17 and it is common for there to be 2 JCs from the country the camp is being held in. On every programme there is a Staff team, usually from the hosting country although there are sometimes international staff. They are in charge of all the doings of the camp with the help of the JCs and the Leaders. When a camp is being run there is always a need for Host Families. These are families who have participants to stay at their houses when the camp has either not begun yet, has ended and participants have some time to wait before their flights leave or, in the case of a Village, when the leaders weekend off is underway. Another thing which is important is Junior Branch. There are many roles to be taken on throughout your local and national Junior Branch, these vary from country to country and national junior branch roles are usually taken on by Juniors aged 16+, however, you can contribute in many ways; from helping to plan your Junior Branch meetings to helping to raise money to host programmes.
Mosaic: The Mosaic programme is local and directly benefiting the community it is in. The local chapters partner with another organization to do a community event, volunteering, or fundrasing.

CISV International, National Associations and Chapters 

The International Office of CISV is located in Newcastle upon Tyne, England.  The Secretary General of the organization is based there, along with a small team of officers and administrative staff.

CISV International is an umbrella organization, with 68 countries or National Associations (NAs). Each NA oversees and supports its local branches or Chapters. CISV USA is the largest National Association with 27 chapters.

Awards and prizes 
 European Citizens' Prize 2013

Gallery

References 

 About CISV International

External  

 CISV International Website
www.cisvcanada.org
www.cisvvictoria.ca
 CISV Mérida, Yucatán México Website

Children's charities based in England
Organizations with participatory status with the Council of Europe
Peace education
Summer camps in the United Kingdom
International educational organizations
Organisations based in Tyne and Wear
Organizations established in 1950